Nahum Tevet (Born 1946, Kibbutz Messilot, Israel) is one of the leading Israeli artists whose work was among the earliest to respond to the minimalist canon by introducing into his installations everyday domestic objects, metaphors and images like in: Corner (1973-4) and Arrangements of Six Units.

Starting the 1980's Tevet’s work turned reductivism upside-down by using geometrical-abstract vocabulary in large-scale intricate labyrinth-like complex sculptures and installations. Those turned into even more extensive installations in the later years 1990s – to today. Tevet has been the subject of major survey exhibitions at both the Israel Museum in Jerusalem  and the Tel Aviv Museum 
 
His work has been part of exhibitions worldwide since 1975, such as numerous solo and group exhibitions in Europe and the United States, among which Documenta 8 (1987), the Sao Paulo Biennale (1994), the Biennale of Lyon (1997), the Venice Biennale (2003) and the Carnegie International (1999), and museum shows at the Museum Moderner Kunst Stiftung Ludwig in Vienna (1997), Dundee Contemporary Art (2004), the Museo d’Arte Contemporanea Roma (2008), the Kunstmuseum Bochum (2015), Museum Sztuki Łódź (2017) and Museum Villa Stuck, Munich (2017).
His work is included in many important museum collections including MOMA, New York, the Philadelphia Museum of Art, Museum Sztuki, Łódź, the Ludwig Foundation, Vienna, the Kaiser Wilhelm Museum, Krefeld, Magasin3, Stockholm, Kunsthalle Mannheim, FRAC Bretagne, the Israel Museum, Jerusalem and the Tel Aviv Museum of Art.

Life and career 
Nahum Tevet (Toib) Was born in 1946 in Kibbutz Messilot, Israel, to his father Mendel Toib and mother Feiga Merin -Toib, both immigrated from Poland in the 1930's. His mother died when he was a baby.

Nahum was raised in the Kibbutz, and while in high school he starts taking art classes at the art teachers’ school of Oranim Collage (1962-3), with teachers like Marcel Janco, Claire Ianiv and Sima Slonim.

In 1965 he was drafted to the army and after 3 years of obligatory service he returned to his home in the Kibbutz where he set an art studio and worked as a gardener. He started studying on a private mentoring basis with painter Rafi Lavie (1969). Influenced by Lavie he painted on Plywood, However, unlike his mentor, Tevet was not interested in what's going on within the paintings format but rather in the painting as an object, its place and its function within the given space. As early as 1970-71 he stops creating traditional painting and made objects and installations mostly from found materials.

In 1970 he married Neta Dominiz, they kept living in Messilot, and have their first son Yaal in 1972.

In 1972 his first one-person exhibition took place at Sara Gilat Gallery, Jerusalem, in this show Tevet exhibited few sculptural objects made from plywood, paper, masking tapes etc (pic.) and some of his Works on Glass from the same year.

The American Artist Robert Rauschenberg saw Works on Glass while visiting Sara Gilat’s home and got very excited, he purchased five pieces from this series, he then asked to meet Tevet and later sent him a small grant and invited him to come to NYC and meet/work there, Tevet, having no money, arrived in NY only few years later in 1979-1980.

After Yom Kippur War in 1973 the young family moved from the Kibbutz to Petah Tikva, a city near Tel Aviv, where they lived for few years.

In 1975 Tevet had his first show in Europe at the prestigious Galerie Schmella, in Dusseldorf and by 1976 had his first museum solo show at the Israel Museum, Jerusalem (curated by Yona Fischer).

In 1979 he moved, with his family to New York, with the support of the America-Israel Cultural Foundation AICF. On the same year he has his second solo show in New York at the Bertha Urdang Gallery. There he exhibited: Installation for Two Rooms, a work that drew a lot of attention.

In 1980, while still in New York, Nahum Tevet was invited to teach at the Bezalel Academy of Arts and Design in Jerusalem, where he quickly became an influential figure as Professor for the Sculpture at the Art Department. By the summer 2000 Tevet was asked to become head of the Advance studies program and was leading the opening of the Bezalel Branch of Salame Street in Tel Aviv. The program shortly became the first recognized MFA program in Israel. Tevet was its director 2001-2010 during this time the program quickly gained local importance and international respectful status and success. Nahum Tevet thought at Bezalel Academy during 1980 -2013.

During the ’80 Tevet produced two series of group of works: Narcissus Series (1980-84) and Painting lesson series (1983-1990), these formalized Tevet’s thoughts and ideas setting the foundation for the works he will make in the coming decades.

1990s the Tel Aviv Museum produced an extensive exhibition of Painting Lesson series titled Painting lessons-Sculptures (1983-1990) curated by Yona Fisher.

In the 1990s a retrospective was held

In 2006 the Israel Museum, Jerusalem mounted  Nahum Tevet Works  1993-2006 curated by Sarit Shapira

Works '70s 
Toward the late 1970, After his solo show at the Israel Museum Jerusalem, He started to develop his Drawing installations For Given Rooms, where similar drawings appeared more than once, as if they were mirroring on opposite walls or in a nearby room. These works came after Installation for two Rooms at the Bertha Urdang Gallery NYC which was the starting point of a major series of large sculptural installations titled the Narcissus Series. In Narcissus Series (1979-1984), large, 'drawing in space' like wooden structures serves to investigate questions of memory and perception.

Reflections, repetitions and mirroring, in these dynamic sculptures there is a gradual development in complexity which remain, as of today, one of the main characteristics of his work.

The Painting Lessons Sculptures 1983-1990 

In this large scale intricate colourful and playful floor (sometimes floor and wall) sculptures, Tevet breaks the distinction between sculpture and painting, while examining both media and the 20s Century historical, modernist and canonic movements. From this group of works many were shown in few European Museum shows, in Documenta 8 and Kassel 1987 (pic). The whole series was a subject of a large exhibition at the Tel Aviv Museum of Art in 1991 (curator Yona Fischer, Catalog).

The British critic -philosopher Michael Newman wrote about the painting Lessons in 1986:

"…We haven't simply left the "Master narratives" behind, but rather continued it in the form "the End of the master narrative"… these speculations are not irrelevant aside, but rather a precondition for understanding the exemplary nature of Tevet sculptures and the reason why it is among the most important art being made today….”

Room Works, 1993-2006 
There were few "rules" to the large rooms floor installations Nahum Tevet created between 1993-2006: In these works, Tevet took away the highly painterly surface, which was so present in the former Painting Lessons Series, and created instead furniture's like modules which components were painted in the same way a housepainter would coat his furniture.  Within the painterly/sculptural/architectural vectors typical to his artistic project, here the painterly aspect is less present.

Despite its complexity, there is no clear constructions behind these works, only “things” standing on the floor near/on each other or leaning, like in a storage or a shop. They are mostly arranged following a grid, and yet, without any visible rational code.

The earlier works of this group is Man with Camera 1993-94 and Untitled 1995-6 followed by A Page from a Catalogue,1998 in which Tevet introduced the "white partitions" a new element which serves as architectonic device, defining areas within the work while creating breaks in the narratives of the event.

Seven Walks 1997-2004 is the Magnum Opus of his installations, measuring 9 x 13 meters took 8 years of work to be completed. The work, made out of thousands of constructed and painted single elements. It grew organically without a plan. It takes the whole room leaving a narrow passageway for the viewer- between the crowded complex installation and the walls of the room around it.

The installation creates a compressed, demanding, morbid situations, similar to a large labyrinth. It’s loaded with a plethora of sculptural events, which offers many narratives for reading and interpretations yet it is constantly causing these to fail. 

The complete group of room's installations was the subject of a large exhibition at the Israel Museum, Jerusalem:  "Nahum Tevet-Works, 1993-2006" curated by Sarit Shapira.

Gallery

Awards and recognition
 2013 The EMET Prize for Art, Science and Culture, the AMN Foundation for the Advancement of Science, Art and Culture in Israel
 2011 Dizengoff Prize for Painting and Sculpture, Tel Aviv- Jaffa
 2007 Life Achievement Award, Ministry of Science, Culture and Sport
 1992 Minister of Education and Culture Prize for an Israeli Artist
 1991 Fondek Prize, Tel Aviv Museum of Art
 1990 America-Israel Cultural Foundation
 1986 Sandberg Prize, Israel Museum, Jerusalem
 1984 Bank Discount Prize, Tel Aviv Museum

Selected exhibitions
 2022 - Kristof De Clercq Gallery, Ghent (October 22).
 2018 - Museum Villa Stuck, Munich, Nahum Tevet / Efrat Natan
 2017 - Museum Sztuki, Lodz, Poland, Nahum Tevet: Works on glass,1972-1975
 2016 - Hunter College, New York, NY. Nahum Tevet: Works on Glass,1972-1975
2012 - Tel Aviv University, Walking on The Wall: Nahum Tevet:Small Sculptures, 1980–2012
2011 - Galeria Foksal, Warsaw, Poland
2010 - Łódz Biennale, Poland
2009 - Fondazione VOLUME! Roma
2008 - Herzliya Museum of Contemporary Art
2008 - Museo d’Arte Contemporanea Roma (MACRO)
2007 - The Israel Museum, Jerusalem, Nahum Tevet: Works, 1994–2006
 2013 - Macro Museum, Rome
 2004 - DCA Dundee Contemporary Art, Dundee
 2003 - Venice Biennale
 1997 - Lyon Contemporary art Biennale
 1991 - Tel Aviv Museum
 1987 - "Documenta 8", Kasel
 1984 - The Israel Museum, Jerusalem
 1984 - Sao Paolo Biennale
 1976 - The Israel Museum, Jerusalem

References

External links 

 
 
 

Israeli sculptors
Living people
1946 births
Jewish artists
Academic staff of Bezalel Academy of Arts and Design
Sandberg Prize recipients